Press Play may refer to:

 Press Play, a news and culture show hosted by Madeleine Brand on KCRW-FM
 Press Play (band), a Christian pop-rock band
 Press Play (album), a 2006 album by Diddy (Sean Combs)
 Press Play (EP), a 2012 EP by BtoB
 Press Play, a 2006 album by Relâche
 Press Play, a song on Snoop Dogg's 2008 album Ego Trippin'
 Press Play, a 2004 short film starring Jerry Broome
 Press Play, a 2006 short film starring Sam Loggin
 Press Play (film), a 2022 film starring Lewis Pullman and Clara Rugaard
 Press Play (company), a Danish game development studio

See also
 Press to Play, a 1986 album by Paul McCartney